Zweibrücken-Land is a Verbandsgemeinde ("collective municipality") in the Südwestpfalz district, in Rhineland-Palatinate, Germany. It is situated on the southwestern edge of the Palatinate forest, around Zweibrücken. The seat of the municipality is in Zweibrücken, itself not part of the municipality.

The Verbandsgemeinde Zweibrücken-Land consists of the following Ortsgemeinden ("local municipalities"):

Verbandsgemeinde in Rhineland-Palatinate